Arwā bint Kurayz was the mother of Uthman ibn Affan, a companion of the Islamic prophet Muhammad, and the third of the Rashidun or "Rightly Guided Caliphs".

Ancestry 
Arwa was the daughter of Kurayz ibn Rabi'ah ibn Habib ibn Abd Shams ibn Abd Manaf, so she was of Banu Abd-Shams, a sub-clan of the tribe of Quraysh. Arwa's mother was Umm Hakim bint Abd al-Muttalib, so Arwa was a cousin of Muhammad.

Children 
Arwa married Affan ibn Abi al-'As and bore him Uthman and Amina. After the death of Affan, Arwa married Uqba ibn Abu Mu'ayt, to whom she bore al-Walid, 'Ammara, Khalid, Umm Kulthum, Umm Hakim and Hind.

Biography 

Arwa bint Kurayz converted to Islam and emigrated to Medina after her daughter, Umm Kulthum bint Uqba. She gave allegiance to Muhammad, and remained in Madina, until she died during the caliphate of her son, Uthman ibn Affan.

See also
 Adnan
 Adnanite Arabs
 Family tree of Uthman
 Banu Hashim

References

Sahabah ancestors
6th-century Arabs
Banu Abd Shams